Fortuna Weekend of Champions was an annual winter international football indoor tournament held from 2007 in O2 Arena, Prague, Czech Republic. In 2011, games were also held at Slovnaft Arena in Bratislava. The tournament was held in the month of January and organized by the gambling and sports betting company Fortuna. The tournament involved 4 or 6 teams: two or three from the Czech Republic, and two or three of Slovakia.

The tournament was played on artificial grass on the pitch and on the playing futsal field. Goal dimensions were 2 x 3 m. The teams played 2x15 minute matches. Participants are divided into two four-man (or according to the three-member cast) groups, where everyone plays with each one match. Teams that finished in last place, they play with each other on the final location for the 4th, the winners and their pursuit in the group play each other semifinal. The losers play for the third place and the winners advance to the final. The first three teams awarded to financial bonus.

Finals

External links
 Fortuna Víkend šampiónů at eurofotbal.cz.

Czech football friendly trophies